Karani script (also Chata script ଛଟା ଅକ୍ଷର) was a cursive/calligraphic style variant of Odia script  developed by the Karana (କରଣ) community/ the scribes (professional writer-class) of the Odia royal courts. It was used in the pre-Independence Orissa (Odisha) region in South Asia and was primarily used by the Karana community who were working for administrative purposes, documentation and keeping records in the royal courts of the Odia princely states (Orissa Tributary States). The name Karani is derived from the metal stylus, Karani that was used for writing on palm leaf.

Use in Odia script

Gallery

References

Odia language
Brahmic scripts